Penthea adamsae is a species of beetle in the family Cerambycidae. It was described by McKeown in 1938. It is known from Australia.

References

Pteropliini
Beetles described in 1938